Ray Hall (born March 2, 1971) is a former American football defensive tackle. Hall played college football at Washington State, and was a member of the Jacksonville Jaguars inaugural season roster in 1995. During the season, he appeared in 12 games for the Jaguars, but recorded no statistics.

References 

1971 births
Living people
American football defensive tackles
Jacksonville Jaguars players
Washington State Cougars football players
Players of American football from Seattle